Drosera filiformis, commonly known as the thread-leaved sundew, is a small, insectivorous, rosette-forming species of perennial herb. A species of sundew, it is unusual within its genus in that the long, erect, filiform (thread-like) leaves of this plant unroll in spirals – an arrangement similar to the circinate vernation seen in ferns.

Distribution and habitat 
D. filiformis occurs naturally in both Canada and the United States; its natural range extends down the eastern seaboard of North America from south western Nova Scotia in the north down through New England to Florida in the south.

Cultivation 
D. filiformis is frequently cultivated, with a few registered cultivars, such as D. filiformis var. filiformis (also known as D. filiformis typical),  D. filiformis × 'California Sunset' (a hybrid between D. filiformis var. filiformis. All of these cultivars are grown with similar conditions as most other Drosera species: mineral-poor soil and distilled, reverse osmosis, or collected rain water. D. filiformis  require a winter dormancy for long-term survival, forming hibernacula in the winter.

Infraspecific taxa
Drosera filiformis f. tracyi (Macf. ex Diels) Macf. (1914)
Drosera filiformis var. tracyi (Macf. ex Diels) Diels (1906)
Drosera filiformis var. typica Winne (1944) nom.illeg.

References

Carnivorous plants of North America
filiformis
Flora of the Eastern United States
Flora of Canada
Plants described in 1808
Taxa named by Constantine Samuel Rafinesque